Watson Falls is a  waterfall on Watson Creek, a tributary of the Clearwater River, in Douglas County in the U.S. state of Oregon.

See also
List of waterfalls in Oregon

References

External links

 Panoramic images of the falls from Don Bain's 360° Panoramas

Waterfalls of Douglas County, Oregon